Colonel Sir Robert Eric Sherlock Gooch, 11th Baronet  (6 May 1903 – 13 November 1978) was a British Army officer and local politician.

Gooch was the son of Sir Thomas Vere Sherlock Gooch, 10th Baronet and Florence Meta Draper. He was educated at Eton College.

After attending the Royal Military College, Sandhurst, Gooch commissioned into the Life Guards. He saw active service during the Second World War and was awarded the Distinguished Service Order in 1941. Between November 1942 and December 1944 he served as the Commanding Officer of the 1st Household Cavalry Regiment, and from 1944 to 1946 he was Colonel of the Household Cavalry.

In 1946 he served as a member of East Suffolk County Council, and on 7 July of that year he succeeded to his father's baronetcy. In 1950 he held the office of High Sheriff of Suffolk. Gooch was a member of the Honourable Corps of Gentlemen at Arms from 1950 to 1973, when he was invested as a Knight Commander of the Royal Victorian Order in the 1973 New Year Honours. In 1963 was promoted to Clerk of the Cheque and Adjutant of the Corps, and in 1968 he became Lieutenant.

He married Katherine Clervaux Chaytor, daughter of Major General Sir Edward Chaytor and Louisa Jane Collins, on 10 November 1926. Together they had four children. Gooch was succeeded in his title by his second son, Richard.

References

1903 births
1978 deaths
British Army personnel of World War II
British Life Guards officers
Companions of the Distinguished Service Order
Graduates of the Royal Military College, Sandhurst
High Sheriffs of Suffolk
Honourable Corps of Gentlemen at Arms
Knights Commander of the Royal Victorian Order
Members of East Suffolk County Council
Baronets in the Baronetage of Great Britain
People educated at Eton College